Jawahar Navodaya Vidyalaya, Karaikal or locally known as JNV Varichikudy is a boarding, co-educational  school in Karaikal district of Puducherry U.T. in India. Navodaya Vidyalayas are funded by the Indian Ministry of Human Resources Development and administered  by Navodaya Vidyalaya Smiti, an autonomous body under the ministry. Navodaya Vidyalayas offer free education to talented children from Class VI to XII. Karaikal district is a coastal enclave within Tamil Nadu state, located about 132 km from union territory headquarter Pondicherry.

History 
The school was established in 1988, and is a part of Jawahar Navodaya Vidyalaya schools. This school is administered and monitored by Hyderabad regional office of Navodaya Vidyalaya Smiti.

Admission 
Admission to JNV Karaikal at class VI level is made through nationwide selection test conducted by Navodaya Vidyalaya Smiti. The information about test is disseminated and advertised in district by the office of Karaikal district magistrate (Collector), who is also the chairperson of Vidyalya Management Committee of JNV Karaikal.

Affiliations 
JNV Karaikal is affiliated to Central Board of Secondary Education with affiliation number 2940002.

See also 

 Jawahar Navodaya Vidyalaya, Puducherry
 Jawahar Navodaya Vidyalaya, Yanam
 Jawahar Navodaya Vidyalaya, Mahe
 List of JNV schools

References

External links 

 Official Website of JNV Karaikal 

High schools and secondary schools in Puducherry
Karaikal
Educational institutions established in 1988
1988 establishments in Pondicherry
Karaikal district